Jenny Owens (born 17 May 1978) is an Australian alpine and freestyle skier, who competed in multiple Winter Olympic Games, including 2002, 2010, and 2014. Owens also competed in the FIS Alpine World Ski Championships twice and the FIS Freestyle World Ski Championships twice, competed for six years on the FIS Alpine Ski World Cup tour and nine years on FIS Freestyle Skiing World Cup and has competed in four Winter X Games, winning the bronze medal in the SkierX in 2012. Owens was a member of the Australian alpine team for seven years, followed by nine years as a member of the ski cross team.

Skiing career

Owens made her Alpine World Cup debut in St Moritz on 17 December 1999. She also collected her first World Cup points (top-30 finish in a race) at this event.

Owens struggled to make the top 30 consistently and did not score any more World Cup points until 21 December 2001, again in St Moritz. Owens' highest placing on the World Cup Alpine tour was 17th in Saalbach-Hinterglemm.

Owens competed in alpine skiing for 14 years, skiing in the 2002 Winter Olympics in Salt Lake City and in two world championships, St Anton 2001 and St Moritz 2003, before retiring from alpine racing in 2004. The following year, Owens decided to make a comeback in order to compete in the new Olympic event of ski cross.

While Owens made the podium on several occasions during her World Cup ski cross career, she suffered several injuries prior to the 2010 Winter Olympics and underwent two knee surgeries in the lead-up to the Games, the second of which was only four weeks beforehand. Owens placed 13th in Vancouver, which was immediately followed by a second knee reconstruction.

Owens returned to the ski cross tour in 2011, collecting a bronze medal at the 2010–11 FIS Freestyle Skiing World Cup in Canada, and finishing 5th at the FIS Freestyle World Ski Championships 2011. The following year, she received bronze at the 2012 Winter X Games.

Owens competed at her third Olympics in Sochi, retiring after a 12th place finish in freestyle skiing.

Olympics

Sochi 2014 – Freestyle

Finished 12th in the Ski cross

Vancouver 2010 – Freestyle

Finished 13th in the Ski cross

Salt Lake 2002 – Alpine

Finished 9th in the combined
Finished 29th in the downhill
Finished 28th in the super-G
Did not finish in giant slalom
Did not start in slalom

World Championships

Voss NOR 2013 – Freestyle

DNF in ski cross

Deer Valley USA 2011 – Freestyle

5th position in ski cross

Inawashiro JPN 2009 – Freestyle

15th position in ski cross

St Moritz SUI 2003 – Alpine

DNF downhill due to injury

St Anton AUT 2001 – Alpine

31 – Downhill
34 – Super-G
31 – Giant slalom

World Cup

Owens has had two silver and two bronze medals on the Freestyle World Cup tour to date in her career.

Owens has been one of the top ranked ski cross athletes since her debut in 2005. In 2009–2010 she had numerous injuries and missed eight of the scheduled world cups and nearly the Vancouver 2010 Olympics.

Owens competed on the Alpine World Cup for six years, placing in the top 30 several times in the Combined and Downhill events.

Winter X Games

Invitation 2012 – qualified 4th = BRONZE
Invitation 2008 – qualified 9th = 4th in semi, did not start small finals
Invitation 2007 – qualified 12th = 3rd in semi, DNF finals
Invitation 2005 – qualified 3rd = injured herself in training prior to the finals

References

External links

Jenny Owens Official Website
Olympic Winter Institute Profile
Facebook Fan Page
FIS Profile

1978 births
Australian female alpine skiers
Alpine skiers at the 2002 Winter Olympics
Freestyle skiers at the 2010 Winter Olympics
Freestyle skiers at the 2014 Winter Olympics
Olympic alpine skiers of Australia
Olympic freestyle skiers of Australia
Sportswomen from New South Wales
Living people
Skiers from Sydney
X Games athletes